Singida United is a Tanzanian football club based in Singida that plays in the Tanzanian Premier League. They play their home games at Namfua stadium in Singida. Singida United won back to back promotions winning the Tanzanian Second Division League Group A in 2016 and the Tanzanian First Division League Group C in 2017. Serbian Dragan Popadic was appointed head coach with Dusan Momcilovic assistant coach on January 12, 2019.

History
The club began in 1972 as Mto Sports Club  in Singida in Central Tanzania. The club started small and began to gain traction in the public eye in the mid-1990s. In 2000 the club made its first appearance in the top tier league, the Tanzanian Premier League. The appearance failed and the club was relegated in 2001. Since 2013, the team made great strides in the Tanzanian Second Division League and the Tanzanian First Division League.

In 2017 the club was promoted back to the Tanzanian Premier League and, the club managed to attract major sponsors. With SportPesa's entry into Tanzania, the club managed to get a sponsorship contract with the betting company, along with Puma Energy Tanzania.

2018/19 season
Singida finished the 2018/19 Tanzanian Premier League season in 13th place with 46 points and a record of 11 wins 13 draws and 14 defeats from 38 matches. They reached the Azam Sports Federation Cup Quarter Final, losing 2–0 to Lipuli FC.

Achievements
 2016 Tanzanian First Division League Group C Winners
 2017 Tanzanian Second Division League Group A Winners

Current squad 2018/19

Technical bench
 Head coach:  Dragan Popadic
 Assistant coach: Dusan Momcilovi

Managers
 Dragan Popadic (2019–present)
 Hemed Seleman Ally 'Morocco' (2018–2019)
 Hans van der Pluijm (2017–2018)

References and notes

External links
 Singida United Facebook page 
 Singida United Twitter page
 Singida United Instagram page

Football clubs in Tanzania